is a Japanese biathlete. She competed in both the 2018 Winter Olympics and the 2022 Winter Olympics.

References

1992 births
Living people
Biathletes at the 2018 Winter Olympics
Biathletes at the 2022 Winter Olympics
Japanese female biathletes
Olympic biathletes of Japan
Biathletes at the 2017 Asian Winter Games
Sportspeople from Aichi Prefecture
21st-century Japanese women